Alfonso IV (s933), called the Monk, was King of León from 925 (or 926) and King of Galicia from 929, until he abdicated in 931.

When Ordoño II died in 924 it was not one of his sons who ascended to the throne of León but rather his brother Fruela II of Asturias. The exact circumstances of the succession upon Fruela's death one year later are unclear, but the son of Fruela, Alfonso Fróilaz, became king in at least part of the kingdom when his father passed. Sancho Ordóñez, Alfonso, and Ramiro, the sons of Ordoño II, claimed to be the rightful heirs and rebelled against their cousin. With the support of king Jimeno Garcés of Pamplona, they drove Alfonso Fróilaz to the eastern marches of Asturias, and divided the kingdom among themselves with Alfonso Ordóñez receiving the crown of León and his elder brother Sancho being acclaimed king in Galicia.

Alfonso IV resigned the crown to his brother Ramiro in 931 and went into a religious house. One year later he took up arms with Fruela's sons Ordoño and Ramiro against his own brother Ramiro, having repented of his renunciation of the world. He was defeated, blinded, and sent back to die in the cloister of Sahagún. Alfonso had married Onneca Sánchez of Pamplona, niece of his ally Jimeno Garcés and daughter of Sancho I of Pamplona by Toda of Navarre.  He had two children: Ordoño IV of León, and perhaps another son, Fruela, who was involved in a land dispute during the reign of Ramiro III of León.

Notes

References

Bibliography

 
 
 
 
 
 
  
 
 
 

 
 
 
 
 
 
 
 

 |-

890s births
933 deaths
Year of birth uncertain
10th-century Leonese monarchs
10th-century Galician monarchs
Beni Alfons
Burials in the Royal Pantheon at the Basilica of San Isidoro
Sons of emperors